Kanua Baba was a Koli saint in Uttar Pradesh, India. Every year the birthday anniversary of Kanua is celebrated by his followers.

Kanua Bawa is respected by certain Indian Muslims and followed by Hindu communities, and he built a masjid and a temple of Bhairon bawa.

Legacy 
 In Goverdhan city of Mathura district, a road is named as Kanua Baba Tiraha.

See also 
 List of Koli people

References

External links 
 कनुआ बाबा का मेला
Kanua Baba

Indian Hindu saints
Koli people